Paul Kouassivi Vieira (14 July 1949 – March 21, 2019) was a Beninese Roman Catholic bishop.

Vieira was born in Benin and was ordained to the priesthood in 1975. He served as bishop of the Roman Catholic Diocese of Djougou, Benin, from 1996 until his death in 2019.

Notes

1949 births
2019 deaths
20th-century Roman Catholic bishops in Benin
21st-century Roman Catholic bishops in Benin
Roman Catholic bishops of Djougou